The Nahoon River is situated in the city of East London on the east coast of South Africa.

Geography
It is to the east of the Buffalo River harbour, and is to the west of Gonubie River. The suburb of Nahoon is on its west bank and Beacon Bay is on the east bank. It flows through an estuary and Africa's southernmost mangrove forest into the Indian Ocean. Its mouth is located near Nahoon Reef which is a famous surfing spot and is also known for attacks by great white sharks.

Water management
The Nahoon Dam supplies some of the water for the city of East London. 
Presently this river is part of the Mzimvubu to Keiskama Water Management Area.

Ecology
There is a small population of the endangered Eastern Province rocky (Sandelia bainsii) in the Nahoon river.

See also 
 List of rivers of South Africa
 List of estuaries of South Africa

References

Rivers of the Eastern Cape
East London, Eastern Cape